The Robbinsville Public School District is a comprehensive community public school district serving students in pre-kindergarten through twelfth grade in Robbinsville Township (known as Washington Township until 2007), in Mercer County, New Jersey, United States. A new high school was established in the district, which started admitting its first students in 2004-05 as part of ending a sending/receiving relationship with the Lawrence Township Public Schools under which students had attended Lawrence High School.

As of the 2018–19 school year, the district, comprised of three schools, had an enrollment of 3,164 students and 237.4 classroom teachers (on an FTE basis), for a student–teacher ratio of 13.3:1.

The district is classified by the New Jersey Department of Education as being in District Factor Group "I", the second-highest of eight groupings. District Factor Groups organize districts statewide to allow comparison by common socioeconomic characteristics of the local districts. From lowest socioeconomic status to highest, the categories are A, B, CD, DE, FG, GH, I and J.

Schools
Schools in the district (with 2018–19 enrollment data from the National Center for Education Statistics) are:
Elementary school
Sharon Elementary School with 1,058 students in grades PreK-4
Nicole Bootier, Principal
Michael Passafaro, Assistant Principal
Middle school
Pond Road Middle School with 1,031 students in grades 5-8
Paul Gizzo, Principal
Tawrye Mason, Assistant Principal
Tom Brettell, Assistant Principal
High school
Robbinsville High School with 1,053 students in grades 9-12
Molly C. Avery, Principal
Nicole Rossi-Mumpower, Assistant Principal
Curtis Wyers, Assistant Principal

Students from Robbinsville Township had attended Lawrence High School as part of a sending/receiving relationship with the Lawrence Township Public Schools which ended with the final group of seniors who graduated in the 2006-07 school year. As of the 2007-08 school year, all four high school grades were housed on campus and the school graduated its first class of approximately 150 students.

Administration
Core members of the district's administration are:
Brian J. Betze, Superintendent
Nick Mackres, Business Administrator / Board Secretary

Board of education
The district's board of education, comprised of nine elected members, sets policy and oversees the fiscal and educational operation of the district through its administration. As a Type II school district, the board's trustees are elected directly by voters to serve three-year terms of office on a staggered basis, with three seats up for election each year held (since 2012) as part of the November general election. The board appoints a superintendent to oversee the day-to-day operation of the district.

References

External links
Robbinsville Public School District
 
School Data for the Robbinsville Township Public Schools, National Center for Education Statistics

Robbinsville Township, New Jersey
New Jersey District Factor Group I
School districts in Mercer County, New Jersey